Liquid Acrobat as Regards the Air is the ninth album by the Incredible String Band. It features Mike Heron, Robin Williamson, Licorice McKechnie and Malcolm Le Maistre. The album was the band's first almost entirely electric recording; a new feature that was to define the change in the band's sound throughout their final period through 1974.

This was also the first album without Rose Simpson who was going to become a sound engineer, but started a family instead. Gerry Conway, a drummer of Fairport Convention appears on the album.

The most ambitious track is also its lengthiest. "Darling Belle", the track Williamson said "came to me in a dream", is composed of three-way vocals and spoken-word. Heron would vocalise and McKechnie would mimic his words with her high-pitch vocals. It tells the story of a woman from childhood to old age. "Tree" is a remake of the song "The Tree" from the band's first album.

Track listing

Personnel 

 Mike Heron - lead vocals (4, 6, 8, 10); guitars (2, 4, 6, 8); bass guitar (4, 11, 12); sitar (1); organ (1, 5, 11); piano (3, 4, 8, 10, 12); harmonium (4, 8); electric piano (7); flute (9); backing vocals (1, 4, 7-8, 10, 12)
 Malcolm Le Maistre - harpsichord (1); percussion (1, 5); bass guitar (2); kazoo (5); whistle (5, 7, 11);  mandolin (6, 11); tenor recorder (9); bouzouki (10); glockenspiel (12), harmonica (12), organ (12), clarinet (12); backing vocals (1, 5-7, 12)
 Licorice McKechnie - lead vocals (3, 9, 12); organ (1, 2, 6, 8); harmonium (1), percussion (1, 7, 10-11); bass guitar (5); kazoo (5); autoharp (11); bironne (11); backing vocals (1-3, 6, 7, 9-10, 12)
 Robin Williamson - lead vocals (1-2, 5, 7, 9, 12); oud (1), violin (1, 4), whistle (1), cymbal (1); guitars (2, 7, 12); cello (4, 8); oboe (4, 6, 12); mandolin (5 ,10); kazoo (5); bass guitar (6); percussion (7); bass recorder (9); fiddle (11); flute (12); banjo (12); string arrangements (12); backing vocals (2, 5, 6, 9-10, 12)

with:

 Gerry Conway, drums (2, 6, 7)
 Stan Lee, pedal steel guitar (1); bass guitar (7)

Charts

References

1971 albums
The Incredible String Band albums
Island Records albums